"Honeymoon" is a 1929 hit popular song written and sung by Joe Howard. His co-writers were Will Howard and Frank R. Adams. The song was revived for the 1947 biopic I Wonder Who's Kissing Her Now sung by June Haver.

References

1929 songs
Songs written by Joseph E. Howard